Boku to Kimi no Subete o Rock 'n Roll to Yobe (僕と君の全てをロックンロールと呼べ) is the third album of the Japanese rock band Sambomaster.

Track listing
 Futari Bocchi no Sekai
 Tegami ~Kitarubeki Ongaku to Shite~
 Sekai wa Sore o Ai to Yobunda ze (album version)
 Kimi no Koe wa Boku no Koi, Boku no Na wa Kimi no Yoru
 Zetsubō to Yokubō to Otokonoko to Onnanoko
 Sekai wa soredemo Shizun de Ikundaze
 Sensō to Boku 
 Itoshisa to Kokoro no Kabe
 Shinon Fūkei
 Get Back Sambomaster
 Ano Musume no Mizugi ni Natte Mitai no da
 Futatsu no Namida
 Hanarenai Futari (album version)
 Baby Yasashii Yoru ga Kite
 Subete no Yoru to Subete no Asa ni Tambourine o Narasu no da (album version)
 Tokyo no Yoru Sayonara
 Boku to Kimi no Subete wa Atarashiki Uta de Utae
 Nani Genakute Idai na Kimi

2006 albums
Sambomaster albums